James Storrie (31 March 1940 – 11 November 2014) was a Scottish professional footballer and manager, best known as a centre forward who helped Leeds United gain promotion in 1964 to the First Division.

Playing career
Born in Kirkintilloch, Dunbartonshire, Storrie began his senior career as a teenager at Airdrieonians, after playing alongside Willie Wallace at Kilsyth Rangers. He made his debut in the 1957–58 season, before being signed by Don Revie for Leeds United as a proven goalscorer for a fee of £15,000 in 1962. He scored the only goal on his debut in Leeds opening match of the 1962–63 season and went on to help Leeds win promotion to the First Division in the 1963–64 season, and to reach the 1965 FA Cup Final. Injuries reduced his first team opportunities and he faded out of the first team before joining Aberdeen in February 1967. He later played for Rotherham United, Portsmouth, Aldershot and St Mirren.

Management career
After leaving St Mirren, Storrie joined Southern League club Waterlooville as player-manager. In 1976, he returned to Scotland as manager of St Johnstone. His last role in football was on the coaching staff back at his first senior club, Airdrie.

Personal life
Storrie was the stepson of Willie Hewitt who played for Partick Thistle, and the son-in-law of Tony Weldon whose clubs included Airdrieonians and Everton.

He died on 11 November 2014, aged 74.

Career statistics

Honours
Leeds United
(English) Football League Second Division Championship 1963–64

References

External links
 

1940 births
2014 deaths
Scottish footballers
Leeds United F.C. players
Aberdeen F.C. players
Scottish football managers
St Johnstone F.C. managers
Sportspeople from Kirkintilloch
Airdrieonians F.C. (1878) players
Airdrieonians F.C. (1878) non-playing staff
Rotherham United F.C. players
Portsmouth F.C. players
Aldershot F.C. players
St Mirren F.C. players
Kilsyth Rangers F.C. players
Scottish Junior Football Association players
Scottish Football League players
English Football League players
Scottish Football League managers
Waterlooville F.C. players
Waterlooville F.C. managers
Association football forwards
Association football coaches
FA Cup Final players